Solapur–Miraj Superfast Express is an intercity Superfast Express train of the Indian Railways connecting  in Maharashtra and  of Maharashtra.

It is the highest priority daily Superfast train of Miraj-Pandharpur-Kurduwadi section. 

Miraj is a Medical City located in Sangli District of India, Miraj is an Important Medical hub for the people of Western Maharashtra & Northern Karnataka.

It is currently being operated with 22155/22156 train numbers on a daily basis. People of Solapur have demanded extension of Solapur–Miraj express up to Kalburagi.  

This extension will connect Gulbarga with districts of Western Maharashtra.

'

▪ Miraj Superfast Express connects Solapur, Kurduvadi, Pandharpur and many other towns with medical city 'Miraj Jn'. There by creating huge economy & patronage to Central Railways.

Service

The 11309/Solapur–Miraj Express has Superfast speed of 4hrs 50mins journey. The 11310/Miraj–Solapur Express has Superfast speed and covers the journey in 4 hours 50 mins.

Route and halts 

The important halts of the train are:

Coach composition

The train consists of 14 coaches:

 7 General
5 Reserved seating. 
 2 Second-class Luggage/parcel van

Traction

Both trains are hauled by a Pune Loco Shed-based WDM-3A diesel locomotive from Solapur to Miraj and vice versa.

Notes

External links 

 11310/Miraj–Solapur Express India Rail Info
 11309/Solapur–Miraj Express India Rail Info

References 

Express trains in India
Rail transport in Maharashtra
Transport in Solapur
Railway services introduced in 2017